Ophelia's Mom: Women Speak Out About Loving and Letting Go of Their Adolescent Daughters is a 2001 book written by Nina Shandler and published by Crown Publishing Group.

The book is an unofficial sequel to Ophelia Speaks which was written by Sara Shandler, the daughter of Nina Shandler.  Sara Shandler wrote the foreword to Ophelia's Mom.

References

External links
Google Books

2001 non-fiction books
American anthologies
American non-fiction books
Sequel books
English-language books